The 2022 Novgorod Oblast gubernatorial election took place on 9–11 September 2022, on common election day. Incumbent Governor Andrey Nikitin was re-elected for a second term.

Background
ASI general director Andrey Nikitin was appointed Governor of Novgorod Oblast in February 2017, replacing two-term Governor Sergey Mitin. Nikitin won the following election with 67.99% of the vote. Nikitin's first term wasn't marked by major accomplishments, however, he was constantly rumoured as a potential candidate for position in the Federal Government.

Due to the start of Russian special military operation in Ukraine in February 2022 and subsequent economic sanctions, the cancellation and postponement of direct gubernatorial elections was proposed. The measure was even supported by A Just Russia leader Sergey Mironov. Eventually, on 10 June Novgorod Oblast Duma called the gubernatorial election for 11 September 2022.

Candidates
Only political parties can nominate candidates for gubernatorial election in Novgorod Oblast, self-nomination is not possible. However, candidates are not obliged to be members of the nominating party. Candidate for Governor of Novgorod Oblast should be a Russian citizen and at least 30 years old. Each candidate in order to be registered is required to collect at least 10% of signatures of members and heads of municipalities. Also, gubernatorial candidates present three candidacies to the Federation Council and election winner later appoints one of the presented candidates.

Registered
 Aleksey Chursinov (LDPR), Member of Novgorod Oblast Duma
 Andrey Nikitin (United Russia), incumbent Governor of Novgorod Oblast
 Aleksey Prokopov (RPPSS), Member of Novgorod Oblast Duma, jurist
 Sergey Shrub (SR-ZP), Member of Veliky Novgorod Duma
 Olga Yefimova (CPRF), former Member of Novgorod Oblast Duma (2006-2011, 2016-2021), 2003, 2012 and 2017 gubernatorial candidate

Failed to qualify
 Anna Cherepanova (Yabloko), Member of Veliky Novgorod Duma, 2017 gubernatorial candidate

Eliminated in primary
 Aleksandr Rozbaum (United Russia), Head of Starorussky District
 Olga Zakharova (United Russia), Member of Novgorod Oblast Duma, cardiologist

Finances
All sums are in rubles.

Results

|- style="background-color:#E9E9E9;text-align:center;"
! style="text-align:left;" colspan=2| Candidate
! style="text-align:left;"| Party
! width="75"|Votes
! width="30"|%
|-
| style="background-color:;"|
| style="text-align:left;"| Andrey Nikitin (incumbent)
| style="text-align:left;"| United Russia
| 120,539
| 77.03
|-
| style="background-color:|
| style="text-align:left;"| Olga Yefimova
| style="text-align:left;"| Communist Party
| 17,211
| 10.99
|-
| style="background-color:;"|
| style="text-align:left;"| Aleksey Chursinov
| style="text-align:left;"| Liberal Democratic Party
| 6,929
| 4.43
|-
| style="background-color:;"|
| style="text-align:left;"| Aleksey Prokopov
| style="text-align:left;"| Party of Pensioners
| 4,008
| 2.56
|-
| style="background-color:|
| style="text-align:left;"| Sergey Shrub
| style="text-align:left;"| A Just Russia — For Truth
| 3,907
| 2.50
|-
| style="text-align:left;" colspan="3"| Valid votes
| 152,594
| 97.52
|-
| style="text-align:left;" colspan="3"| Blank ballots
| 3,880
| 2.48
|- style="font-weight:bold"
| style="text-align:left;" colspan="3"| Total
| 156,474
| 100.00
|-
| style="background-color:#E9E9E9;" colspan="6"|
|-
| style="text-align:left;" colspan="3"| Turnout
| 156,474
| 32.79
|-
| style="text-align:left;" colspan="3"| Registered voters
| 477,158
| 100.00
|-
| colspan="5" style="background-color:#E9E9E9;"|
|- style="font-weight:bold"
| colspan="4" |Source:
|
|}

Incumbent Senator Sergey Mitin (United Russia) was re-appointed to the Federation Council.

See also
2022 Russian gubernatorial elections

References

Novgorod Oblast
Novgorod Oblast
Politics of Novgorod Oblast